Begum Rokeya Day is the 9 December anniversary of the birth and death of Begum Rokeya, a Bengali writer, educationist, social activist, and advocate of women's rights. The day is organized and celebrated by schools, colleges and universities of Bangladesh, as well as the Bengali Government, as a tribute to her works and legacy. On that day, Bangladesh government confers Begum Rokeya Padak on individual women for their exceptional achievement.

See also
 List of festivals in Bangladesh
 Begum Rokeya Padak

References

Begum Rokeya
Festivals in Bangladesh
Festivals of Bangladeshi culture